Burry Port is an electoral ward, representing the community of Burry Port, Carmarthenshire, Wales.

Profile
In 2014, the Burry Port electoral ward had an electorate of 3,387. The total population was 4,240, of whom 80.3% were born in Wales. 32.2% of the population were able to speak Welsh.

Current Representation
The Burry Port Ward is a two-member ward for the purposes of Carmarthenshire County Council elections. It is currently represented by Labour Party councillors Jack James (first elected in 2012) and Amanda Fox (first elected in 2017).

Recent history
The first election to the new unitary Carmarthenshire County Council took place in 1995. Burry Port had two seats, both of which were won by the Liberal Democrats. Keith Evans, the sitting member for the ward on Dyfed County Council, was elected alongside George West, a sitting member on Llanelli Borough Council.

 
 

At the 1999, Labour gained both seats, having won one in a by-election.

 

Labour lost one of the seats to an Independent in 2004.

 
 

In 2008, the situation remained unchanged.

 
 
 

In 2012, Labour, regained the second seat. Pat Jones, a member of the authority since 1999, was re-elected alongside another Labour candidate who narrowly ousted the sitting Independent member, who had served since 2004. The Conservative candidate had stood as a Liberal Democrat in 1999.

Earlier History

County Council Elections
Burry Port first became an electoral ward in the early twentieth century, having initially been part of the Pembrey ward at the formation of Carmarthenshire County Council. In due course two wards were created at Ammanford for county council electionsand these continued to exist until Carmarthenshire was abolished in 1974.

With the formation of Dyfed County Council, Ammanford continued to elect two councillors until the wards were merged in 1989.

When the current Carmarthenshire County Council was formed in 1995, a Burry Port ward based on the community of that name was created.

District Council Elections
From 1987, Burry Port formed an electoral ward for the purposes of elections to Llanelli Borough Council. Burry Port returned three members.

References

External links

Carmarthenshire electoral wards
Burry Port